Yvonne Edna Cossart  (14 August 1934 – 16 December 2014) was an Australian virologist, who discovered the parvovirus B19 in 1975.

Cossart graduated from the University of Sydney with a Bachelor of Science in 1957 and MB BS in 1959.

She was appointed an Officer of the Order of Australia in the 1998 Queen's Birthday Honours for "service to medicine as a specialist in infectious diseases, especially in the areas of virological research, epidemiology and disease prevention, and to education".

Cossart died at Greenwich Hospital on 16 December 2014, at the age of 80. She was survived by her husband, Ted Wills, and son, Tom Wills.

Works

References

1934 births
2014 deaths
Australian virologists
Officers of the Order of Australia
Academic staff of the University of Sydney
University of Sydney alumni
Women virologists
20th-century Australian scientists
20th-century women scientists
21st-century Australian scientists
21st-century women scientists